Dakota Junior Senior High School, formerly Dakota High School, is a combined junior-senior high school located in the town of Dakota, Illinois. The Dakota Community Unit School District became the third-largest school district in Stephenson County in 1949 when the State of Illinois mandated that larger school districts be created and Davis High School was consolidated into Dakota's High School. Only the districts of Freeport, and Lena-Winslow are larger.

Facilities
Dakota Community Unit School District No. 201 includes students from the villages of Dakota, Davis, Rock City, Rock Grove and Lake Summerset (Stephenson County residents only). Even though the village of Davis has a larger population, because the village of Dakota is the most centrally located community, its name was given to the new union. All students within the CUSD attend Dakota Elementary prior to attending the high school.

Athletics
The Indians compete in the Northwest Upstate Illini Conference.  They participate in several IHSA sponsored athletics and activities, including; football, girls' volleyball, boys' and girls' basketball, wrestling, boys' and girls' golf, boys' and girls' track and field, boys' baseball, girls' softball, speech, and music.

Athletic achievements

Teams
The following teams finished in the top four of their respective IHSA sponsored state championship tournaments:

Football: 2A State Champions (2005–06) 2A State Champions (2007–08) 1A State Champions (2011–12)
Volleyball (girls): 1A State Champions (2011–12)2nd place (2012–13)2nd place (2014–15)
Wrestling:4th place (1988–89)2nd place (1993–94)3rd place (2004–05) 1A State Champions (2005–06)3rd place (2006-07) 1A State Champions (2012–13) 1A State Champions (2013–14) 1A State Champions (2014–15) 1A State Champions (2015–16)

References

External links
 
 Illinois State Report Card - 2016

Public high schools in Illinois
Schools in Stephenson County, Illinois